Alexandra Annelise Frantti (born March 3, 1996) is an American professional volleyball player who plays as an outside hitter for the United States women's national volleyball team and Italian Series A1 professional league Casalmaggiore.

Early life

Alexandra Annelise Frantti was born in Highland Park, Illinois to parents Kelly and Dan Frantti. She grew up in Spring Grove, Illinois. She attended high school at Richmond Burton, where she played volleyball. She played club volleyball for Club Fusion and won back-to-back AAU titles, collecting MVP honors in 2012. She was the Illinois Gatorade Player of the Year in 2013 and committed to play volleyball at Penn State. She was the #2 nationally ranked recruit coming out of high school.

Career

College
After leading the team in kills her freshman season, Frantti was named the AVCA National Freshman of the Year and a second team All-American after helping Penn State win its 7th NCAA title in 2014. At the beginning of her senior year in 2017, she surpassed the 1,000 career mark at Penn State.

Professional clubs

  Calcit Volley (2017–2018)
  ASPTT Mulhouse (2018–2019)
  KS DevelopRes Rzeszów [pl] (2019–2020)
  Chieri (2020–2022)
  Casalmaggiore (2022–)

After spending two seasons with Chieri, Frantti signed with Casalmaggiore for the 2022–2023 season.

USA National Team

In May 2022, Frantti made her national team debut when she was named to the 25-player roster for the 2022 FIVB Volleyball Nations League tournament. In her first match with the national team she had 15 kills, which led the team during the opening match win vs. Dominican Republic. She led all players in a win vs. Poland, with 15 kills and 3 blocks. A few days later, she had a dominating performance in a win vs. Thailand, finishing with 27 points on 24 kills, two blocks and one ace, and recorded 10 digs.

Frantti made her second major international competition just 3 months after her national team debut when she was named to the roster for the 2022 FIVB World Championship. In the preliminary pool round, she started several matches as an outside hitter, becoming the highest scorer on the floor for all three matches. In the opening match victory versus Kazakhstan, she posted a team high 14 points via 13 kills and 1 service ace. In the following match versus Canada, she followed up with another high scoring performance, leading all scorers with 15 points via 14 kills and a block. The next match saw opponent Bulgaria, which was another victory for the United States. Frantti again led in points for the third straight match, with 19 points via 17 kills, a block, and a service ace.

Awards and honors

Clubs

Team
 2017–2018 Slovenian League –  Silver medal, with Calcit Volley
 2017–2018 Slovenian Cup –  Silver medal, with Calcit Volley
 2018–2019 French Ligue A –  Bronze medal, with ASPTT Mulhouse.
 2018–2019 French Cup –  Bronze medal, with ASPTT Mulhouse.
 2019–2020 TAURON Liga  Silver medal, with KS DevelopRes Rzeszów.
 2019–2020 Trofeo McDonald's Imola  Bronze medal, with KS DevelopRes Rzeszów.
 2020–2021 Italian Cup  Bronze medal, with Chieri
 2021–2022 Italian Cup  Bronze medal, with Chieri

Individual
Polish Cup - Best Outside Hitter (2019–2020)
French Ligue A - Best Outside Hitter (2018–2019)

College

 2014 NCAA Division I Championship –  Champions, with Penn State
AVCA National Freshman of the Year (2014)
AVCA Second Team All-American (2014)
AVCA All-Northeast Region (2015, 2016, 2017)

References

1996 births
Living people
Sportspeople from Illinois
Outside hitters
American women's volleyball players
Penn State Nittany Lions women's volleyball players
American expatriate sportspeople in Poland
American expatriate sportspeople in Italy
American expatriate sportspeople in Slovenia
American expatriate sportspeople in France
Expatriate volleyball players in Italy
Expatriate volleyball players in Poland
Expatriate volleyball players in Slovenia
Expatriate volleyball players in France
Serie A1 (women's volleyball) players
21st-century American women